Phen may refer to:

 Phen, an abbreviation for the chemical compound phenethylamine
 Phen, an abbreviation for the chemical compound phenanthroline
 Phen, an abbreviation for phentermine in the pharmaceutical drug known as fen-phen
 Phen District, a district in Udon Thani Province, Thailand
 Pyen language, also known as Phen, a Loloish language of Burma